Hendrika ("Hennie") Penterman (born 29 September 1951) is a former medley swimmer from the Netherlands, who competed for her native country at two consecutive Summer Olympics, starting in 1968 in Mexico City, Mexico. There she was eliminated in the qualifying heats of the 200 m and 400 m individual medley. Four years later in Munich, West Germany, the same happened for Penterman in both her events.

References

1951 births
Living people
Dutch female medley swimmers
Olympic swimmers of the Netherlands
Swimmers at the 1968 Summer Olympics
Swimmers at the 1972 Summer Olympics
Swimmers from Amsterdam
20th-century Dutch women